Rebecca Busbus Buslon-Tushinsky (January 31, 1929 – March 11, 2010) better known as Rebecca del Rio was a Filipino actress typecasted as a glamorous contravida or villain in Sampaguita Pictures who was the first Filipino to be awarded as Asia’s Best Actress.

She made numerous movies under Sampaguita Pictures. In 1955, she signed a contract to LVN Pictures and made her first movie Dinayang Pagmamahal aka Foolish Love, a Jaime de la Rosa and Charito Solis movie.

Personal life
Rebecca del Rio hailed from Sierra Bullones, Bohol, Philippines. She was the daughter of lawyer and former congressman Teofilo Buslon and his wife Demetria Busbus, a nurse and former mayor of Pilar, Bohol. She was also the sister of the late former provincial board member Dr. Socorro Tallo, aunt of fashion designer Maximiel Tallo and grandmother of Miss Bohol 1997 lawyer Socorro Tallo-Inting.

Rebecca graduated from Holy Spirit School and went to the Philippine Women's University in Manila to study and was discovered by Sampaguita Pictures.

She was the first Filipino to receive the Best Actress Award in Asia. She personally received the award in Japan. She was also FAMAS’ Best Supporting Actress in 1958.

According to Leo Udtohan, a journalist who wrote an article about Del Rio at The Philippine Star in 2005, in the peak of her career being a premier and classic Sampaguita Star, she left Philippines after she married a SONY executive and resided in the US.

As the Cherie Gil of her time, she appeared on several films such as Ang Ating Pag-ibig (1953), Kurdapya (1955) with Gloria Romero, Dolphy, Ric Rodrigo, Ramon Revilla, Aruray and Eddie Garcia, Mister, Kasintahan (1953), Pilya (1954) with Gloria Romero, Ric Rodrigo, Lolita Rodriguez, Luis Gonzales, José de Villa and Horacio Morelos; Pitong Krus ng Isang Ina (1968) with Rosemarie Sonora, Ramil Rodriguez, Edgar Salcedo, Alicia Alonzo, Rosa Aguirre; Sabungera (1954) - Lolita Rodriguez, Ric Rodrigo, Dolphy, Rosa Mia, Boy Alano and Horacio Morelos; Mariposa (1955) with Gloria Romero, Ric Rodrigo, Rosa Mia, Panchito Rudy Francisco, Norma Vales, Aruray, Bella Flores; and Lollipops, Roses and Talangka (1971) with Nora Aunor, Victor "Cocoy" Laurel and Oscar Moreno.
 
She later married Joseph Tushinsky.

Rebecca Tushinsky died March 11, 2010. She is survived by a son, Robert Joseph Tushinsky.

Filmography
1951 - Tres Muskiteros
1952 - Mayamang Balo
1952 - Hiram na Mukha
1953 - Ang Ating Pag-ibig
1953 - Cofradia
1953 - Anak ng Espada
1953 - Mister Kasintahan
1953 - Vod-A-Vil
1954 - Musikong Bumbong
1954 - Tres Muskiteras
1954 - Pilya
1954 - Milyonarya at Hampaslupa
1954 - Dalagang Ilocana
1954 - Sabungera
1954 - Bondying
1954 - Kurdapya
1955 - Lola Sinderella
1955 - Bulaklak sa Parang
1955 - Mariposa
1955 - Dinayang Pagmamahal
1955 - Talusaling
1956 - Luksang Tagumpay
1956 - Laging Ikaw
1957 - Cuatro Vidas
1957 - Turista
1958 - Rebelde
1958 - Malvarosa
1958 - Mr. Kuripot

References

External links

1931 births
2010 deaths
Actresses from Bohol
Philippine Women's University alumni